Jean François Macé (22 August 1815 in Paris – 13 December 1894 in Monthiers) was a French educator, journalist, active freemason and politician. He was perhaps best known as the founder of Ligue de l'enseignement to promote free, universal and secular education. From 1883 until his death, he was a senator for life in the Third Republic Senate.

References

External links
 

1815 births
1894 deaths
Politicians from Paris
French republicans
French life senators
French Freemasons
French male journalists
French educators
19th-century French politicians
19th-century French male writers
19th-century French journalists